Captain James Butler White, DFC, RNAS (7 July 1893 – 2 January 1972) was a World War I Royal Naval Air Service flying ace.

White was born on Manitoulin Island, Ontario, Canada.

He served with No. 8 Naval Squadron RNAS, which was renamed No. 208 Squadron RAF after the Royal Naval Air Service was merged with the Royal Flying Corps to form the Royal Air Force in 1918. He achieved 12 victories in total, his first on 24 January 1918 and his last two on 3 October 1918. All of his victories were scored while flying a Sopwith Camel.

The citation for his Distinguished Flying Cross (published in The London Gazette on 3 December 1918) read:

A fine fighting pilot who has accounted for eight enemy aeroplanes. He has led numerous offensive and low bombing raids, and by his able and daring leadership has achieved great success with a minimum of casualties to his patrol.

After the war, White entered the finance industry in Toronto and was eventually President of the Toronto Stock Exchange.

References

External links
His page at theaerodrome.com
Canada Veterans Hall of Valour

1893 births
1972 deaths
Canadian World War I flying aces
Royal Naval Air Service aviators
Royal Navy officers
Royal Air Force officers
Recipients of the Distinguished Flying Cross (United Kingdom)
People from Manitoulin Island
Canadian military personnel from Ontario